Onoba obliqua is a species of minute sea snail, a marine gastropod mollusk or micromollusk in the family Rissoidae.

Distribution

Description 
The maximum recorded shell length is 3.9 mm.

Habitat 
Minimum recorded depth is 63 m. Maximum recorded depth is 686 m.

References

 Warén A. (1974). Revision of the Arctic-Atlantic Rissoidae (Gastropoda, Prosobranchia). Zoologica Scripta 3: 121-135
 Bouchet P. & Warén A. (1993). Revision of the Northeast Atlantic bathyal and abyssal Mesogastropoda. Bollettino Malacologico supplemento 3: 579-840
 Gofas, S.; Le Renard, J.; Bouchet, P. (2001). Mollusca. in: Costello, M.J. et al. (eds), European Register of Marine Species: a check-list of the marine species in Europe and a bibliography of guides to their identification. Patrimoines Naturels. 50: 180-213.

External links
 Warén A. (1996). New and little known mollusca from Iceland and Scandinavia. Part 3. Sarsia 81: 197-245

Rissoidae
Gastropods described in 1974